Nickel aluminide typically refers to the one of the two most widely used compounds, Ni3Al or NiAl, however is generally any aluminide from the Ni-Al system. These alloys are widely used due to their corrosion resistance, low-density and easy production.  Ni3Al is of specific interest as the strengthening γ' phase precipitate in nickel-based superalloys allowing for high temperature strength up to 0.7-0.8 of its melting temperature. Meanwhile, NiAl displays excellent properties such as low-density (lower than that of Ni3Al), good thermal conductivity, oxidation resistance and high melting temperature. These properties, make it ideal for special high temperature applications like coatings on blades in gas turbines and jet engines. However, both these alloys do have the disadvantage of being quite brittle at room temperature while Ni3Al remains brittle at high temperatures as well. Although, it has been shown that Ni3Al can be made ductile when manufactured as a single crystal as opposed to polycrystalline. Another application was demonstrated in 2005, when the most abrasion-resistant material was reportedly created by embedding diamonds in a matrix of nickel aluminide.

Ni3Al 
The chief issue with polycrystalline Ni3Al-based alloys is its room-temperature and high-temperature brittleness. This brittleness is generally attributed to the inability for dislocations to move in the highly ordered lattices. Researchers worked hard to address this brittleness as it greatly reduced the potential structural applications these Ni3Al-based alloys could be used for. However, in 1990, it was shown that the introduction of small amount of boron can drastically increase the ductility by suppressing intergranular fracture. Once this was addressed focus turned to maximizing the structural properties of the alloy. As mentioned, NiAl3-based alloys derive their strength from the formation of γ' precipitates in the γ which strength the alloys through precipitate strengthening. In these NiAl3-based alloys the volume fraction of the γ' precipitates is as high as 80%. Due to this high volume fraction the evolution of these γ' precipitates during the life cycles of these alloys has been a field of great interest. One of the main concerns is the coarsening of these γ' precipitates at high temperature (800 °C to 1000 °C) which greatly reduces the strength of these alloys. This coarsening is due to the balance between interfacial and elastic energy in the γ + γ' phase and is generally inevitable over long durations of time. Current research has attempted to address this coarsening issue by introducing other elements. Elements such as Fe, Cr and Mo have shown to create unique multiphase configurations that can significantly increase NiAl3-based alloys' creep resistance at 1000 °C for 1000 hours. This creep resistance is attributed to the formation of inhomogeneous precipitate Cr4.6MoNi2.1 which pins dislocations and prevents further coarsening of the γ' phase. This addition of Fe and Cr also drastically increases the weldability of the NiAl3-based alloy which still posed a significant issue for industrial use despite its easy and cost effective production. In general, Ni3Al acts as an excellent strengthening precipitate in Ni-based alloys making these materials ideal for high temperature, load bearing applications. Further research is being done to address the pitfalls of this material via the incorporation of other elements.

NiAl 
NiAl despite its beneficial properties generally suffers from two factors: very high brittleness at low temperatures (<330 °C) and rapid loss of strength for temperatures higher than 550 °C. The brittleness is attributed to both the high energy of anti-phase boundaries as well as high atomic order along grain boundaries. Similar to that of Ni3Al-based alloys these issues are generally addressed via the integration of other elements. Attempted elements can be broken into three groups depending on their influence of microstructure:

 Elements that form ternary intermetallic phases such as Ti and Hf
 Pseudobinary eutectic forming elements such as Cr
 Elements with high solubility in NiAl such as Fe, Co and Cu

Some of the more successful elements have been shown to be Fe, Co and Cr which drastically increase room temperature ductility as well as hot workability. This increase is due to the formation of γ phase which modifies the β phase grains. Alloying with Fe, Ga and Mo has also been show to drastically improve room temperature ductility as well. Most recently, refracturing metals such as Cr, W and Mo have been added and resulted in not only increases in room temperature ductility but also increases in strength and fracture toughness at high temperatures. This is due to the formation of unique microstructures such as the eutectic alloy Ni45.5Al9Mo and α-Cr inclusions that contribute to solid solution hardening. It is even being shown that these complex alloys (Ni42Al51Cr3Mo4) have the potential to be fabricated via additive manufacturing processes such as selective laser manufacturing, vastly increasing the potential applications for these alloys.

IC-221M
An alloy of Ni3Al, known as IC-221M, is made up of nickel aluminide combined with several other metals including chromium, molybdenum, zirconium and boron. Adding boron increases the ductility of the alloy by positively altering the grain boundary chemistry and promoting grain refinement.  The Hall-Petch parameters for this material were σo = 163 MPa and ky = 8.2 MPaˑcm1/2. Boron increases the hardness of bulk Ni3Al by a similar mechanism.

This alloy is extremely strong for its weight, five times stronger than common SAE 304 stainless steel. Unlike most alloys, IC-221M increases in strength from room temperature up to 800 °C.

The alloy is very resistant to heat and corrosion, and finds use in heat-treating furnaces and other applications where its longer lifespan and reduced corrosion give it an advantage over stainless steel. It has been found that the microstructure of this alloy includes Ni5Zr eutectic phase and therefore solution treatment is effective for hot working without cracking.

Properties
Ni3Al has a cubic crystalline structure of the L12 type, with lattice parameter a = 355.9 pm.
Density = 7.16 g/cm3
Yield Strength = 855 MPa 
Hardness = HRC 12
Thermal Conductivity Ni3Al = 28.85 (W/m.K)
Thermal Conductivity NiAl = 76 (W/m.K) 
Melting Point Ni3Al = 1668 K
Melting Point NiAl = 1955 K
Thermal expansion coefficient = 12.5 (10−6/K)
Bonding = covalent/metallic
Electrical resistivity = 32.59 (10−8Ωm)

References

Nickel compounds
Nickel alloys
Aluminides